Anderso Ribeiro Pereira (born April 15, 1980), known as Tegao, is a Brazilian footballer who previously played for PSMS Medan in the Indonesia Super League.

References

External links

1980 births
Association football forwards
Brazilian expatriate footballers
Brazilian expatriate sportspeople in Indonesia
Brazilian footballers
Expatriate footballers in Indonesia
Liga 1 (Indonesia) players
Living people
Footballers from Rio de Janeiro (city)
America Football Club (RJ) players
Duque de Caxias Futebol Clube players
KÍ Klaksvík players
Clube Náutico Capibaribe players
PSMS Medan players
São Paulo FC players